The 1934 Maine gubernatorial election took place on September 10, 1934. Incumbent Democratic Governor Louis J. Brann defeated Republican challenger Alfred K. Ames.

Results

References

Gubernatorial
1934
Maine
September 1934 events